Andrew Henry George (born 2 December 1958) is a British Liberal Democrat politician. He was the Member of Parliament (MP) for the constituency of St Ives in Cornwall from 1997 to 2015, when he was defeated by the Conservatives' Derek Thomas. He was the Vice-Chairman of the All Party Parliamentary Housing and Planning Group in the 2010 parliament. He currently serves as a Cornwall Councillor for Ludgvan, Madron, Gulval and Heamoor, having been elected in the 2021 local elections.

Early life
George was born in the village of Mullion near The Lizard, on the southwest coast of Cornwall, one of eight children born to a horticulturist father and music teacher mother.

Education
George was educated locally at Helston Grammar School, in the town of Helston in Cornwall, before attending the University of Sussex where he received a Bachelor of Arts degree in cultural and community studies in 1980. He finished his education at University College at the University of Oxford, where he was awarded a master's degree in agricultural economics in 1981.

Life and career
George worked as a charity worker, initially, as a rural officer with the Nottinghamshire Rural Community Council in 1981, and held a number of appointments in charity, business and research, until he became the deputy director of the Cornwall Rural Community Council in 1987, where he remained until his election to the House of Commons. Before joining the Liberal Democrats he was a member of Mebyon Kernow, and was one of the founder members of the Cornish Constitutional Convention, campaigning for a Cornish Assembly.

He contested the seat of St Ives at the 1992 general election where he finished second, just 1,645 votes behind the sitting Conservative MP David Harris. Harris stood down at the 1997 general election and George won the seat with a majority of 7,170 and remained as the MP there until 2015. He made his maiden speech on 22 May 1997.

In Parliament
In the House of Commons, George led the Liberal Democrats' Parliamentary DEFRA and Environment team. He rebelled against the Conservative/Liberal Democrat coalition government more than any other Liberal Democrat MP.

George was made the Liberal Democrats' Fisheries Spokesman by Paddy Ashdown in 1997, a role he undertook until 2007. Under the new leadership of Charles Kennedy in 1999 he also became Disability spokesperson as part of the Department of Social Security team. Following the 2001 General Election he became Parliamentary Private Secretary to the Leader of the Liberal Democrats Kennedy. He became Rural Affairs and Food spokesperson in 2002, a role he held until 2005. He was International Development spokesperson from the 2005 general election until 2006,

On 6 January 2006, George was one of the first members of the Liberal Democrat frontbench team to threaten to resign his post if Charles Kennedy had not stood down as leader by 9 January 2006. He was replaced on the front bench on 8 March by Kennedy's successor, Sir Menzies Campbell.

George suffers from the autoimmune disease Ankylosing spondylitis and has campaigned for a TNF inhibitor drug treatment to be made available to all patients. He is a member of the National Ankylosing Spondylitis Society's experts panel.

In the 2010 general election, George's majority was substantially reduced from 11,609 to 1,719 following boundary changes to his constituency.

Cornish issues
From his election victory in 1997, George has campaigned in Parliament on many issues key to Cornwall. An early success was the campaign to win millions of pounds of European economic aid for Cornwall from the Objective One funding programme, for which he chaired the All Party Parliamentary Objective One Group.

On 12 May 2005, George became the first MP to swear his oath of allegiance to the Queen in Cornish after a long campaign for the language's official recognition George also claims to have been the first MP to use Cornish in his maiden speech back in 1997.

George voted in Parliament against Cornwall becoming a unitary authority. Local polls commissioned by the district councils indicated that approximately 80% of the public were opposed to the formation of the Cornish Unitary Authority.

Opposition to bedroom tax 
George sponsored a Private Member's Bill, the Affordable Homes Bill, to limit the application of the "bedroom tax" benefit cut only to tenants that had rejected a "reasonable offer" of alternative accommodation with the correct number of bedrooms. The bill reached the second reading stage after the Government was defeated in a vote in the House of Commons, but failed to proceed further because the Government did not supply a Money Resolution. George opposed the "bedroom tax" in earlier votes, saying that those who supported it "should come down to meet some of my constituents who are affected by it and look them in the eye as they attempt to justify it".

On Cornwall Council
In March 2021, it was reported that George was standing for election to Cornwall Council in the 2021 local elections. At the elections, George won the seat of Ludgvan, Madron, Gulval and Heamoor with 56% of the vote, beating a Conservative incumbent.

In February 2022 it was announced that George would once again be standing as the Liberal Democrats' candidate for the St Ives constituency at the next general election.

Publications
 The Natives are Revolting Down in the Cornwall Theme Park by Andrew George, 1986
 Cornwall at the Crossroads by Bernard Deacon, Andrew George et al., 1989 CoSERG, Redruth 
 A Vision of Cornwall by Andrew George, 1995
 A View from the Bottom Left-Hand Corner by Andrew George, 2002, Patten Press, Penzance

See also

 Liberal Democrat frontbench team
 List of topics related to Cornwall

References

External links
 Andrew George official site
 Profile at the Liberal Democrats
 
 Profile: Andrew George  at BBC News, 10 February 2005
 Andrew George Official Picture Profile

1958 births
Alumni of the University of Sussex
Alumni of University College, Oxford
Liberal Democrats (UK) MPs for English constituencies
Living people
Members of the Parliament of the United Kingdom for St Ives
UK MPs 1997–2001
UK MPs 2001–2005
UK MPs 2005–2010
UK MPs 2010–2015
Liberal Democrats (UK) councillors